Crassispira suffecta is an extinct species of sea snail, a marine gastropod mollusk in the family Pseudomelatomidae, the turrids and allies.

Description
The length of the shell attains 28 mm.

Distribution
Fossils have been found in Eocene strata in the Paris Basin, France.

References

External links
 Pacaud J.M. & Le Renard J. (1995). Révision des Mollusques paléogènes du Bassin de Paris. IV- Liste systématique actualisée. Cossmanniana. 3(4): 151-187
  Lutétien, Stratotype. "Le contenu paléontologique du Lutétien du bassin de Paris."

suffecta
Gastropods described in 1909